Ladislav Smoček (born 24 August 1932, Prague, Czechoslovakia) is a Czech writer, playwright and theater director.

Biography 
He comes from a family with a military tradition. His father was an officer in The Czechoslovakian Army. After studying at a secondary school in Plzeň he graduated as a theatre director from the Theatre Faculty of the Academy of Performing Arts in Prague (DAMU) in 1956. His schoolmate there was for example Václav Hudeček and one of his professors was for also  František Salzer. He started his career in The City Theatre in Benešov (1956–1957), then he was active in Brno (1957–1960) and in 1960 got a place as a director in Laterna magika in Prague. And after few more years he decided to move to the National theatre company where he in 1965 co-founded The Drama Club (Činoherní klub), where he remains employed as a playwright and director until the present. In the period between 1992 – 1993 he was a director of the Vinohrady Theatre and he acted there as a director on a few occasions since that time. Though he wrote less than ten plays, he is together with Václav Havel and Pavel Kohout one of the most performed Czech playwrights.

Plays
Piknik (1965) (opening performance of The Drama Club /DC/)
Dr. Burke's Strange Afternoon (1966) (translated into fourteen languages)
The Maze (1966) (one act)
Bitva na Kopci (?) (one act)
Cosmic Spring (1970)
The Noose (1972) (written in English)
Nejlepší den (1995) (the only play performed in Plzeň instead of DC)

Selected performances – director
2006 – Les Liaisons dangereuses by Christopher Hampton, DC
2005 – Me and Jezebel by Elizabeth Fuller, Divadlo Ungelt
2004 – The Businessman from Smyrna by Carlo Goldoni, DC
2003 – Driving Miss Daisy by Alfred Uhry, Divadlo Ungelt
2002 – Mask and The Face by Luigi Chiarelli, DC
2001 – Deskový statek by Václav Štech, DC 
1999 – Marriage Play by Edward Albee, Divadlo Ungelt
1997 – Wild Spring by Arnold Wesker, Divadlo Ungelt
1994 – Vodní družstvo by Josef Štolba, DC

Awards
2006 The prize of The Ministry of Culture of the Czech Republic
2007 Laureate of the Karel Čapek of the Czech Centre of the International PEN club

References

Literature 
 Petr Hořec, Milan Neděla: Rozpomínky, Goldstein & Goldstein, Prague, 1997, str. 36, 
  Z. Sílová, R. Hrdinová, A. Kožíková, V. Mohylová : Divadlo na Vinohradech 1907 – 2007 – Vinohradský ansámbl, issued by Divadlo na Vinohradech, Prague, 2007, str. 117, 119, 124, 127, 136, 139, 144, 150, 189, 191, 193,

External links 
 Article on Spisovatelé.cz
 Ladislav Smoček on Vetrnemlyny.cz
 Divadlo 2007, Article "Ladislav Smoček neznámý"
 
 Ladislav Smoček (interview from Czech Television show "Na plovárně") – online streaming from the TV archive

1932 births
Living people
20th-century Czech dramatists and playwrights
Czech male dramatists and playwrights
Czech theatre directors
Writers from Prague
Recipients of the Thalia Award